John Everetts (August 25, 1873 – September 12, 1956) was a United States Navy sailor and a recipient of the United States military's highest decoration, the Medal of Honor.

Biography
Born on August 25, 1873, in Thorold, Ontario, Everetts immigrated to the United States and was living in New York City when he joined the Navy. On that day, he and Ship's Cook First Class Daniel Atkins attempted unsuccessfully to rescue Ensign Joseph Breckinridge, who had fallen overboard. For this action, both Everetts and Atkins were awarded the Medal of Honor three months later, on May 20, 1898.

Everetts's official Medal of Honor citation reads:
Serving on board the U.S.S. Cushing, 11 February 1898, Everetts displayed gallant conduct in attempting to save the life of the late Ens. Joseph C. Breckinridge, U.S. Navy, who fell overboard at sea from that vessel.

Everetts reached the rank of chief petty officer before leaving the Navy. He died on September 12, 1956, at age 83 and was buried at Long Island National Cemetery in Suffolk County, New York.

See also

List of Medal of Honor recipients during peacetime

References

1873 births
1956 deaths
People from Thorold
Canadian emigrants to the United States
United States Navy sailors
United States Navy Medal of Honor recipients
Canadian-born Medal of Honor recipients
Non-combat recipients of the Medal of Honor